Nívea da Costa Pinto Soares (born 25 July 1976) is a Brazilian Christian singer, songwriter, worship pastor, writer and television presenter.

Biography 
Nívea Soares was born in a Christian home, and since childhood has always been involved with music. She has four brothers and is the youngest of her family.

Nívea is a member of the Lagoinha Baptist Church, in 1998 began singing in worship ministry Diante do Trono, led by singer Ana Paula Valadão.

Her  first solo album was "Reina Sobre Mim" recorded in 2003.

In 2012 she released the CD and DVD Glória e Honra. The album is considered her most successful work, with several nationally known songs. The song "Em Tua Presença", became the highlight of the album and has millions of views on YouTube.

Discography 
 Albums
 Reina Sobre Mim (2003)
 Enche-me de Ti (2005)
 Fan the Fire (2006)
 Rio (2007)
 Acústico (2009)
 Emanuel (2010)
 Glória e Honra (2012)
 Canção da Eternidade (with Antônio Cirilo and David Quinlan) (2014)
 Reino de Justiça (2016)
 Jesus (2019)

 Collects
 Diante do Trono (2009)
 10 Anos (2013)

Singles 

 Deus Vivo (2016)
 Ousado Amor (2018)
 Jesus (2019)
 Rocha Eterna (2019)
 Reina o Senhor (2019)
 Grande é o Senhor (2019)
 Pai de Amor (2019)
 Eu Me Prostro (2019)
 Venceu (2019)
 Há Um Rio (2019)

Television program 
Lugar Secreto (2013–present)

Bibliography 
Os Improváveis de Deus (2016)
 O Pedido Final (2019)

References

External links
Official website

1976 births
Living people
Brazilian television evangelists
Christian music songwriters
Performers of contemporary worship music
Brazilian gospel singers
Brazilian singer-songwriters
People from Belo Horizonte
Brazilian evangelicals
Brazilian Baptists
21st-century Brazilian singers
21st-century Brazilian women singers
Brazilian women singer-songwriters